Douglas Simpson (born 15 May 1982 in Glasgow) is a field hockey player from Scotland. Simpson started his career at Stepps HC before moving to Western Wildcats in 2002. Simpson enjoyed a free-scoring partnership with Scott McCartney for some years. His predatory skills are also shown off to great effect indoors, where he has also picked up caps. A career highlight was selection for the 2006 Commonwealth Games in Melbourne, along with teammates Dunlop, David Mansouri and Graham Moodie.

References

sportscotland 

1982 births
Living people
Scottish male field hockey players
Field hockey players at the 2006 Commonwealth Games
Field hockey players from Glasgow
Commonwealth Games competitors for Scotland